General elections were held in India between 17 and 21 February 1967 to elect 520 of the 523 members of the 4th Lok Sabha, an increase of 15 from the previous session of Lok Sabha. Elections to State Assemblies were also held simultaneously, the last general election to do so.

The incumbent Indian National Congress government retained power, albeit with a significantly reduced majority. Indira Gandhi was resworn in as the Prime Minister on 4 March.

Background 
By 1967, economic growth in India had slowed – the 1961–1966 Five-Year Plan gave a target of 6% annual growth, but the actual growth rate was 2%. Under Lal Bahadur Shastri, the government's popularity was boosted after India prevailed in the 1965 War with Pakistan, but the war, along with the previous 1962 War with China, put a strain on the economy. Internal divisions were emerging in the Indian National Congress while its two popular leaders Nehru and Shastri had both died. Indira Gandhi had succeeded Shastri as leader, but a rift had emerged between her and Deputy Prime Minister Morarji Desai, who had been her rival in the 1966 party leadership contest.

Results 
The INC suffered setbacks in seven states, which included Gujarat, where INC won 11 out of 24 seats while Swatantra Party won 12 seats; Madras, where INC won 3 out of 39 seats and DMK won 25 seats; Orissa, where they won 6 out of 20 seats and Swatantra Party won 8 seats. Rajasthan where they won 10 out of 20 seats Swatantra Party won 8 seats, West Bengal where they won 14 out of 40, Kerala where they won only 1 out of 19. Delhi where they won 1 out of 7 while remaining 6 were won by Bharatiya Jana Sangh. The party was also ousted from power in nine states, while losing governance in Uttar Pradesh one month after the election.

See also
Election Commission of India
1967 Indian presidential election

References

 
Indian general election
India
General elections in India